Line in the Sand is the third and final full-length album by Texas melodic hardcore band Close Your Eyes, released on October 29, 2013, through Victory Records. It is the band's only album featuring lead vocalist Sam Robinson, formerly of Blessed by a Broken Heart.

Track listing

Personnel
Sam Robinson – lead vocals
Brett Callaway – guitar, backing vocals
Andrew Rodriguez – guitar, engineering
Sonny Vega – bass, backing vocals
Jordan Hatfield – drums

Additional personnel
Tommy Green – guest vocals on track 6
Zoli Téglás – guest vocals on track 9
Erin Nicole Ellithorpe – guest vocals
Cameron Webb – Record producer, engineer

References

2013 albums
Close Your Eyes (band) albums
Victory Records albums
Christian hardcore albums
Post-hardcore albums by American artists
Pop punk albums by American artists